Yaroslava "Yasa" Nechaeva (also romanized as Iaroslava Netchaeva) is a former ice dancer who competed with Yuri Chesnichenko for the Soviet Union, Russia, and Latvia. She currently lives in Ann Arbor, Michigan where she works as a coach.

Career 
Nechaeva was partnered with Yuri Chesnichenko when they were fourteen. They won the silver medal at the 1992 World Junior Championships for the Soviet Union. The following season, they won silver at the 1992 Skate Canada International competing for Russia. In their final season, they switched to Latvia and placed 13th at the 1994 European Championships.

After retiring from competition, Nechaeva/Chesnichenko performed on tour with Torvill/Dean's Ice Adventures. In 1999, they began coaching at the Ann Arbor Figure Skating Club in Ann Arbor, Michigan.

Among Nechaeva and Chesnichenko's current and former students are Emily Samuelson / Todd Gilles, Emily Samuelson / Evan Bates, Madison Hubbell / Keiffer Hubbell, and Lynn Kriengkrairut / Logan Giulietti-Schmitt. At the 2007 U.S. Championships, their teams swept the junior ice dancing podium.

Competitive highlights 
With Chesnichenko

References 

Latvian female ice dancers
Russian female ice dancers
Soviet female ice dancers
Russian emigrants to the United States
Sportspeople from Ann Arbor, Michigan
Russian figure skating coaches
American figure skating coaches
Figure skating choreographers
Living people
Year of birth missing (living people)
World Junior Figure Skating Championships medalists
American female ice dancers
Female sports coaches
21st-century American women